Ali Mohamed Mohamed El-Sawy (born February 16, 1995) is an Egyptian karateka. He is the current World Number 1 Rank in the Men’s Individual -67 Kg Kumite and he won a Bronze Medal in Karate at the 2017 Islamic Solidarity Games, The 4th Islamic Solidarity Games held at Baku Sports Hall, Baku, Azerbaijan from 13 to 14 May 2017. he got bronze medal at world championship Dubai 2021

Career 
He won the gold medal in Male Kumite -67 kg, his first title of Karate’s most important competition in nearly two years in WKF Karate 1 Premier League 2020-=2021 and previously he won medals in the World Karate Championships.

He also won several medals, including gold, silver and bronze medals in the African & Mediterranean Championships as well as the World Karate Federation Karate 1 Premier League and Series A Championships.

Achievements 
He qualified for the 2020 Summer Olympics in Tokyo, Japan as WKF Olympic Standings Ranking qualifying spots, where karate will be featured for the first time and 
now he will represent Egyptian Team at the 2020 Summer Olympics at the Karate competition of the 2020 Summer Olympics in Tokyo, Japan.

References

External links 
 
 

1995 births
Living people
Sportspeople from Cairo
Egyptian male karateka
Olympic karateka of Egypt
Karateka at the 2020 Summer Olympics
African Games medalists in karate
Competitors at the 2019 African Games
African Games bronze medalists for Egypt
21st-century Egyptian people